The Castanheiras Pied Tamarin Wildlife Refuge, formerly Castanheiras Pied Tamarin Ecological Reserve, is a wildlife refuge in the municipality of Manaus, Amazonas, Brazil.
It was created in 1982 to protect a colony of pied tamarins.

Foundation

The reserve was located in the Industrial District on the outskirts of the Manaus Free Zone.
The purpose was to protect populations of pied tamarins (Saguinus bicolor) and Brazil nuts (Bertholletia excelsa).

The wildlife refuge today occupies .
From 2001 it was managed by the Municipal Office of the Environment and Sustainability (Secretaria Municipal de Meio Ambiente e Sustentabilidade, Semmas) for the Manaus Prefecture.
It became part of the Central Amazon Ecological Corridor, established in 2002.
The refuge has access roads, administrative buildings, a kitchen for food preparation for animals, an autopsy building, a veterinary centre with inpatient rehabilitation structures and grounds.

Activities

The wildlife refuge contains a Wild Animal Screening Centre (CETAS) and an Animal Rescue Service.
These help wild animals that are threatened by risks such as habitat loss, domestic abuse, accidents and other problems.
A veterinarian examines the animal and treats it if necessary. 
Where practical it is restored to nature.
Otherwise it may be allocated to a zoo or other institution.
The refuge is not open to the public.

Notes

Sources

Wildlife refuges of Brazil
Protected areas of Amazonas (Brazilian state)